Gann, son of Dela, of the Fir Bolg was a legendary joint High King of Ireland with his brother Genann, succeeding their brother Rudraige. His wife was Etar.

When the Fir Bolg invaded Ireland the five sons of Dela divided the island among themselves. Gann and Senngann landed at Inber Dubglaise and split Munster between them, Gann taking the north and Sengann the south of the province.

When their brother Rudraige died, Gann and Genann became joint High King for four years, until they both died of plague, along with two thousand of their followers, and were succeeded by Sengann.

Primary sources
 Lebor Gabála Érenn
 Annals of the Four Masters
 Seathrún Céitinn's Foras Feasa ar Érinn

Legendary High Kings of Ireland
Fir Bolg